Edge of Insanity is the first studio album by guitarist Tony MacAlpine, released in 1986 through Shrapnel Records. In 2014, nearly thirty years after its release, MacAlpine performed the album in full during a series of shows in California and Baja California.

Critical reception

In a contemporary review, Paul Henderson of Kerrang! defined MacAlpine's technical abilities on guitar and piano as "quite phenomenal", but found his playing "totally cold" and with "a serious lack of rock 'n' roll attitude", while, in contrast, praised "the masterful, superbly sympathetic, yet also inspired" performance of bassist Billy Sheehan and drummer Steve Smith.

Andy Hinds of AllMusic described Edge of Insanity as following "the rough blueprint of Yngwie [Malmsteen]'s model" and praised MacAlpine's "impressive licks" and "exciting guitar/keyboard interplay". However, he remarked that "his second album, Maximum Security, is much better." Canadian journalist Martin Popoff gave the same judgement, but considered Edge of Insanity "nicely intimate, versatile and not embarassingly recorded."

In a 2009 article by Guitar World magazine, Edge of Insanity was ranked fourth on the all-time top ten list of shred albums. The staff wrote: "The album that launched Mike Varney's Shrapnel Records, Edge of Insanity shows off Tony MacAlpine's fearsome shred chops not only on the six-string ("Quarter to Midnight") but also on the ivories ("Chopin, Prelude 16, Opus 28")."

Track listing

 – On some reissues of the album, "Empire in the Sky" is split into two tracks.

Personnel
Musicians
Tony MacAlpine – guitars, keyboards, bass (track 7)
Billy Sheehan – bass (except track 7)
Steve Smith – drums

Production
Mike Varney – producer
Steve Fontano – engineer
George Horn – mastering at Fantasy Studios, Berkeley, California
Mike Mani – keyboards programming

References

External links
In Review: Tony MacAlpine "Edge Of Insanity" at Guitar Nine Records

Tony MacAlpine albums
1986 debut albums
Shrapnel Records albums
Albums produced by Mike Varney